Ivan Gregorewitch Olinsky (1 January 1878 – 11 February 1962) was a Russian Empire-born American painter and art instructor.

Biography
Olinsky was born in Yelisavetgrad , Russian Empire (now Kirovohrad, Ukraine).  After immigrating to the United States at the age of twelve, he studied at the National Academy of Design, then worked for the American muralist George Willoughby Maynard, then for Elmer Garnsey, then for John La Farge in Boston until about 1906.

Olinsky became best known for his female portraits in a style that tended towards Impressionism.  He was awarded full membership in the National Academy of Design in 1919, and served as an longtime instructor at the Art Students League of New York in Manhattan, New York City.

By 1942 he was living in New London, Connecticut. Olinsky suffered a stroke in December 1961, and he died on 11 February 1962.

Legacy
His second daughter, Tosca Olinsky (1909–1984), was a notable painter in her own right.  Both father and daughter are associated with the Old Lyme Art Colony in Old Lyme, Connecticut.  Olinsky's papers reside at the Smithsonian.

References

External links 
 Biographical Notes, a collection of biographical information and images of 50 American artists, containing information about the artist on page 40.
 Two exhibition catalogs, available from the Metropolitan Museum of Art Libraries.

1878 births
1962 deaths
20th-century American painters
American male painters
Art Students League of New York faculty
National Academy of Design members
Emigrants from the Russian Empire to the United States
People from New London, Connecticut
People from Manhattan
20th-century American male artists